Kirsty Nicole Robb (born 23 May 1979) is a road cyclist from New Zealand. She represented her nation at the 1999, 2001, 2002 and 2003 UCI Road World Championships.

References

External links
 profile at Procyclingstats.com

1979 births
New Zealand female cyclists
Living people
Place of birth missing (living people)
21st-century New Zealand women